While some locations have changed, the 2023 Professional Women's Bowling Association (PWBA) Tour season matches the 2022 season with 12 title events scheduled in eight cities. These include eight standard singles title events, three major title events, and one mixed doubles event. Final rounds of the season's three majors (USBC Queens, U.S. Women's Open and PWBA Tour Championship) will all be broadcast nationally on CBS Sports Network, while all other tournaments will be broadcast on BowlTV, the USBC's YouTube channel. The USBC Queens major will be held at Sam's Town Bowling Center in Las Vegas, Nevada, the Tour's first stop at this venue since the 2000 season. Another 2023 highlight will be the season-opening Stockton Open, which marks the PWBA Tour’s 100th event since its 2015 relaunch.

There are two Classic Series tour stops in 2023: the PWBA Great Lakes Classic Series in Wyoming, Michigan and the PWBA Waterloo Classic Series in Waterloo, Iowa.  Classic Series stops feature three title events in the same location. The first two tournaments have fully open fields, while the third tournament starts with only the top 24 players in pinfall from the qualifying rounds of the first two tournaments.

Tournament summary

Below is a list of events for the 2023 PWBA Tour season. Major tournaments are in bold. Career PWBA titles for winners are in parenthesis. All winnings are shown in US dollars ($).

References

External links
 PWBA.com, home of the Professional Women' Bowling Association

2023 in bowling